Rafiuddin Deobandi (1836 – 1890) was an Indian Muslim scholar who served as the Vice-Chancellor of Darul Uloom Deoband.

Biography
Deobandi was born in 1836. He was a disciple of Abdul Ghani Mujaddidi. He served the Deoband seminary as the Vice-Chancellor of Darul Uloom Deoband twice; first time from 1867 to 1868, and the second time from 1871 to 1888.

Rafiuddin died in 1890 in Medina and was buried in Jannat al-Baqīʿ.

References

Bibliography
 

1836 births
1890 deaths
Hanafis
Deobandis
Academic staff of Darul Uloom Deoband
Vice-Chancellors of Darul Uloom Deoband
Burials at Jannat al-Baqī
Indian Sunni Muslim scholars of Islam
19th-century Indian Muslims
People from Deoband